Gmina Radków may refer to either of the following administrative districts in Poland:
Gmina Radków, Lower Silesian Voivodeship
Gmina Radków, Świętokrzyskie Voivodeship